The Love Romance of the Girl Spy is an American silent film produced by Kalem Company and directed by Sidney Olcott. It is a story about the Civil War.

Production notes
The film was shot in Jacksonville, Florida.

References
 The Moving Picture World, vol 6, p. 657, p. 700, p. 784.
 The New York Dramatic Mirror, 7 mai 1910, p. 20.

External links

 The Love Romance of the Girl Spy website dedicated to Sidney Olcott

1910 films
Silent American drama films
American silent short films
Films set in Florida
Films shot in Jacksonville, Florida
Films directed by Sidney Olcott
1910 short films
1910 drama films
American black-and-white films
1910s American films
1910s English-language films
American drama short films